Roland Greenfield (June 19, 1919 – August 22, 1997) was a former Democratic member of the Pennsylvania House of Representatives.

A resident of Ventnor City, New Jersey, Greenfield died at the age of 78 at Philadelphia's University of Pennsylvania Hospital.

References

Democratic Party members of the Pennsylvania House of Representatives
People from Ventnor City, New Jersey
1919 births
1997 deaths
20th-century American politicians